Asperula tinctoria, common name dyer's woodruff, is a plant in the family Rubiaceae, a native of much of northern and central Europe from France to Russia and also of Western Siberia.

Uses
The root is used by the ancient Greeks and Romans to make a red dye for clothing, but is less productive than the more widely used  madder Rubia tinctorum.

References

External links
Botanik im Bild  /  Flora von Österreich, Liechtenstein und Südtirol, Rubiaceae  /  Asperula tinctoria, Färber-Meier
Altervissta Flora Italiana, Asperula tinctoria
Flore Alpes (Fouillouse France), Aspérule des teinturiers, Asperula tinctoria

Plant dyes
tinctoria
Plants described in 1753
Taxa named by Carl Linnaeus
Flora of France
Flora of Germany
Flora of Poland
Flora of Finland
Flora of Russia
Flora of Ukraine
Flora of Croatia
Flora of Italy
Flora of Romania
Flora of Hungary
Flora of Sweden
Flora of Estonia
Flora of Austria
Flora of Switzerland